John Kalbach Valentine (February 3, 1904 – October 12, 1950) was an American Democratic politician and lawyer.

Born in Oskaloosa, Iowa, Valentine graduated from University of Wisconsin–Madison and received his law degree from University of Iowa College of Law. He then practiced law in Centerville, Iowa. Valentine served in the Iowa State Senate representing the 3rd District, and then as Lieutenant Governor of Iowa. Valentine died in Centerville, Iowa serving under Governor Nelson G. Kraschel. He was interred in Oakland Cemetery in Centerville, Iowa.

References

|-

1904 births
1950 deaths
People from Oskaloosa, Iowa
People from Centerville, Iowa
Democratic Party Iowa state senators
Lieutenant Governors of Iowa
United States Attorneys for the Southern District of Iowa
University of Wisconsin–Madison alumni
University of Iowa College of Law alumni
20th-century American lawyers
20th-century American politicians